Thomas Anthony Siano (January 10, 1907 – April 1, 1986) was an American football offensive lineman in the National Football League for the Boston Braves and Brooklyn Dodgers.  He played college football at Fordham University. Thomas was also the first Italian-American captain of the Waltham High School football team in Waltham, Massachusetts.

References

1907 births
1986 deaths
Players of American football from Massachusetts
American football centers
Boston Braves (NFL) players
Brooklyn Dodgers (NFL) players
Sportspeople from Waltham, Massachusetts
Waltham High School alumni